Kafr Qouq or Kafr Qawq (Arabic: كفرقوق) is a Syrian village in the Qatana District of the Rif Dimashq Governorate. According to the Syria Central Bureau of Statistics (CBS), Kafr Qouq had a population of 1,015 in the 2004 census.

References

External links

Populated places in Qatana District